CRC Concise Encyclopedia of Mathematics is a bestselling book by American author Eric W. Weisstein.

Summary

The book is presented in a dictionary format. The book is divided into headwords. The book also provides relevant diagrams and illustrations.

Lawsuits

The book became the subject of a lawsuit between CRC Press and Eric W. Weisstein. The CRC Press claimed Weisstein's website MathWorld violated the copyright on the CRC Concise Encyclopedia of Mathematics. During the dispute, a court order shut down MathWorld for over a year starting October 23, 2000. According to Eric Weisstein's personal site, he restarted MathWorld on November 6, 2001. Wolfram Research, Stephen Wolfram, and Eric Weisstein settled with the CRC Press for an undisclosed financial award and several benefits. Among these benefits are the legal rights to reproduce MathWorld in book format again.

Reception

The book has consistently received good reviews.

Editions

 1st edition, CRC Press, 1999, 
 2nd edition, CRC Press, 2002, 
 3rd edition, CRC Press, 2005,

References

External links
wolfram.com
crcpress.com
crcpress.com 
crcnetbase.com
google.com

2002 non-fiction books
Books about mathematics
Encyclopedias of mathematics
CRC Press books